Cyperus paolii is a species of sedge that is native to an area of eastern Africa in southern Somalia.

The species was first formally described by the botanist Emilio Chiovenda in 1915.

See also 
 List of Cyperus species

References 

paolii
Taxa named by Emilio Chiovenda
Plants described in 1915
Flora of Somalia